Akhil Gupta (born 1959) is an Indian-American anthropologist whose research focuses on the anthropology of the state, development, as well as on postcolonialism. He is currently a Professor of Anthropology at the University of California, Los Angeles. He is a former president of the American Anthropological Association.

Education
Gupta attended St. Xavier's School in Jaipur and graduated in 1974. Gupta did his undergraduate studies in Mechanical Engineering from Western Michigan University, following that with a Madters in Mechanical Engineering from the Massachusetts Institute of Technology. Gupta then spent the next eight years getting a Ph.D. in Engineering-Economic Systems from Stanford University.

Career

Research
In 1992, while still at Stanford, Gupta along with fellow Stanford anthropologist James Ferguson wrote the well-known and oft-cited essay, "Beyond 'Culture': Space, Identity, and the Politics of Difference." which argued that the analytic concept of culture had remained largely unproblematized by anthropological discourse, and that anthropologists of the day had failed to recognize and analyze the politics of cultural difference, how such differences were produced, and how such differences were used and abused by the state and by capital. The article argues for the examination of cultural anthropology as an unconscious mechanism of neo-imperialism.

Gupta has done extensive work in rural North India. In his book, Postcolonial Developments: Agriculture in the Making of Modern India, Gupta analyzes whether and how post-colonial theory can be applied to subaltern rural places. He attempts to understand the growth of modern India through its agricultural sector. Most of his work has taken place in the western part of the north Indian state of Uttar Pradesh. Gupta has also tried to understand the ethnography of the state - as lived, understood and discussed in rural India.

He is also a leading figure in the anthropology of the state, and is the co-editor of a book of collected essays called The Anthropology of the State: A Reader.

Tenureship controversy
Gupta was unanimously approved for tenure in 1996 at Stanford, but was then denied tenure by the dean John Shoven. However, in the face of outcry from across the academy as well as mobilization by students, the dean's decision was overturned.

Selected publications
 Postcolonial Developments: Agriculture in the Making of Modern India, 1997
 Editor, The Anthropology of the State: A Reader (with Aradhana Sharma), 2006
 Editor, Caste and Outcast (with Gordon Chang and Purnima Mankekar), 2002
 Editor, Culture, Power, Place: Explorations in Critical Anthropology (with James Ferguson), 1997
 Editor, Anthropological Locations: Boundaries and Grounds of a Field Science (with James Ferguson), 1997

References

External links
 Stanford page
 Stanford Humanities Center Fellowship Profile Page for Akhil Gupta
 Iris F. Litt Award
 Anthropology department splits in two over tenure ship

Stanford University Department of Anthropology faculty
Living people
Scientists from Jaipur
Western Michigan University alumni
Stanford University alumni
University of California, Los Angeles faculty
MIT School of Engineering alumni
1959 births